SM Brand Marketing (SMBM) is a South Korean intellectual property, licensing, management, marketing consultation, planning, and management consulting company under SM Entertainment. The company was established on August 19, 2008, and has operated SM Town Coex Artium, Sum, Sum Market, and Sum Café. It currently employs its e-commerce platform SM Town &Store and retail store SM Town &Store@DDP.

History 
On August 19, 2008, SM Entertainment announced that it would establish SM Brand Marketing, adding it to its affiliates. The company is in charge of brand planning and marketing consulting, such as planning, branding, and marketing on lifestyle businesses encompassing the restaurant industry, fashion, and food and beverage industries. The business also includes intellectual property (IP) rights and licensing, management, marketing, and consultancy and operates Sum, Sum Market, and Sum Café. Sum, a celebrity shop run by the company, is where items related to the artists are sold and is located on the second floor of closed SM Town Coex Artium. The shop offers merchandise products commercializing the company's artists. SMBM also operates its global e-commerce platform SM Town &Store and retail shop SM Town &Store@DDP.

On February 23, 2022, SMBM signed a memorandum of understanding (MoU) with Binance to launch a global Play-to-Create (P2C) ecosystem. In the future, SMBM plans to establish diverse environments wherein creators worldwide can participate in IP-based re-creation and earn profits transparently, including affiliated royalties. SMBM and Binance will push for joint work to create a blockchain mainnet, NFT, and eco-fund. The company also partnered with The Sandbox for its metaverse platform, P2C ecosystem, and SM Town Land, a themed space created in K-verse, an area for K-content in The Sandbox. SMBM and The Sandbox will plan and create NFT products using their IP, production know-how, and technology and jointly operate a fan-participating service.

Brands 

 SM Town &Store
 SM Town &Store@DDP
 Kwangya Club
 SM Town Meta-Passport
Defunct

 SM Town Coex Artium

Sum
 Sum Market
 Sum Café

Notes

References 

SM Entertainment subsidiaries
South Korean companies established in 2008
Intellectual property organizations
Licensing organizations
Management organizations